The Jonah Kit is a 1975 science fiction novel by English writer Ian Watson. In 1977, The Jonah Kit won the BSFA Award for Best Novel.

References

External links

1975 British novels
1975 science fiction novels
English science fiction novels
Victor Gollancz Ltd books